Ahn Eun-jin (Korean: 안은진; Hanja: 安恩眞; born May 6, 1991) is a South Korean actress.

Filmography

Film

Television series

Web series

Theater

Plays

Musicals

Awards and nominations

References

External links 
 Ahn Eun-jin at Bigboss Entertainment
 

1991 births
Living people
21st-century South Korean actresses
South Korean television actresses
South Korean stage actresses
South Korean musical theatre actresses
Korea National University of Arts alumni